Bidya Sing Engleng is an Indian politician who serves as an MLA representing the Diphu constituency in the Assam Legislative Assembly. He was first elected in the 2001 Assam Legislative Assembly election as a candidate affiliated with the Indian National Congress. He was re-elected from the same constituency in 2006 and 2011 as part of the Indian National Congress and in 2021 with the Bharatiya Janata Party.

References 

Bharatiya Janata Party politicians from Assam
Living people
People from Karbi Anglong district
Assam MLAs 2021–2026
Year of birth missing (living people)